10 (styled X) is a one-track EP from British funk band Sault, released on 10 October 2022, to positive critical reception.

Critical reception
Jem Aswad of Variety praised the release for being part of Sault's history of innovative releases and characterizes different movements of the song as a "power-trio version of a Bob Marley song" followed by "a piano-led ballad... with a gorgeous soulful chorus" and ending in "a gentle acoustic song". In Paste, Rosa Sofia Kaminski also notes the three-act structure and praises the release for having a "story is told so intimately that it feels like it happened to someone you know".

Track listing
"Angel" – 10:10

Personnel
Chronixx
Inflo – production
Jack Peñate

Chart performance

See also
List of 2022 albums

References

External links

2022 albums
Albums produced by Inflo
Sault (band) albums
Self-released albums
Reggae EPs
Reggae albums by English artists